Priluki is a rural locality (a settlement) in Opokskoye Rural Settlement, Velikoustyugsky District, Vologda Oblast, Russia. The population was 24 as of 2002.

Geography 
Priluki is located 66 km southwest of Veliky Ustyug (the district's administrative centre) by road. Porog is the nearest rural locality.

References 

Rural localities in Velikoustyugsky District